Pando is an extinct town in Eagle County, Colorado, United States. The GNIS classifies it as a populated place.

History
A post office called Pando was in operation from 1891 until 1942. Pando is a name derived from Spanish meaning "slow".

See also

 List of ghost towns in Colorado

References

External links

Ghost towns in Colorado
Geography of Eagle County, Colorado